Lieutenant Colonel James M. Cushing (circa 1910 – August 26, 1963) was a mining engineer in US Army who commanded the Philippine resistance against Japan on Cebu Island in the Philippines  during World War II.

Early life
James McCloud Cushing was born at Guadalajara, Mexico, about 1910 to Canadian-born U.S. citizen George Cushing (1856-1925) and Mexican citizen Simona (De Navares) Cushing (1895-1981).  George was a managing director of the Canada Mexico Trading Company. In 1920, the family was living in El Paso, Texas, and ten year-old "Jimmie's" native tongue was listed as Spanish.

Military

Cushing's forces in the Cebu Area Command numbered about 8,500.  In early 1944, he was instrumental in the Koga affair in which the Z Plan of the Imperial Japanese Navy was recovered by his guerrillas.  Cushing traded Japanese admiral Shigeru Fukudome and other survivors of a plane crash (but not the captured Z Plan) for the assurance that Japanese forces on Cebu would stop murdering civilians; a promise which the Japanese kept.  In 1945, he was awarded the Distinguished Service Cross.

Post war
Cushing survived the war and continued living in the Philippines.  On August 26, 1963, he and his wife Wilfreda Alao (Sabando) Cushing were on an inter-island transport en route to Mindoro Island from where they lived at TayTay, Palawan Island, when he succumbed to a heart attack. He was 53 years old.  Colonel Cushing was interred in Libingan ng mga Bayani (Heroes' Cemetery) in Manila.

See also
List of American guerrillas in the Philippines
Battle of the Visayas
The Rescue: A True Story of Courage and Survival in World War II, Steven Trent Smith, Hoboken:John Wiley & Sons, (2001)  
TABUNAN: The Untold Story of the Famed Cebu Guerillas of World War II, Col. Manuel F. Segura, excerpts hosted by the Cebu Eskrima Society

References

1910s births
1963 deaths
Recipients of the Distinguished Service Cross (United States)
United States Army colonels
United States Army personnel of World War II
American guerrillas of World War II
Place of birth missing
Burials at the Libingan ng mga Bayani